Cecil Wood (8 April 1896 – 1990) was an Australian cricketer. He played five first-class matches for Tasmania between 1928 and 1930.

See also
 List of Tasmanian representative cricketers

References

External links
 

1896 births
1990 deaths
Australian cricketers
Tasmania cricketers
Cricketers from Tasmania